Let Me Be Your Angel is the second studio album by American singer Stacy Lattisaw. Released on April 21, 1980, by Cotillion Records, Lattisaw was 13 years old when this album was released. The album's first two singles, "Dynamite!" and "Jump to the Beat", both peaked at number one on the U.S. disco charts in 1980. This would be her first album produced by Narada Michael Walden.

Track listing
All tracks composed by Bunny Hull and Narada Michael Walden; except where indicated
"Jump to the Beat" (Lisa Walden, Narada Michael Walden) – 5:20   	
"Dynamite!" – 6:07 	
"You Don't Love Me Anymore" – 3:17 	
"Dreaming" – 4:47 	
"Let Me Be Your Angel" – 4:03 	
"Don't You Want to Feel It (for Yourself)" – 5:55 	
"You Know I Like It" (Corrado Rustici, Narada Michael Walden) – 5:23 	
"My Love" (Narada Michael Walden) – 4:52

Charts

Singles

Personnel
Stacy Lattisaw – lead and backing vocals
Narada Michael Walden – drums, keyboards, percussion, piano
Nile Rodgers, Corrado Rustici – electric guitar
Bernard Edwards, T. M. Stevens – bass
Randy Jackson – acoustic and electric bass
Frank Martin – keyboards
Jim Gilstrap, Carla Vaughn, Judy Jones – backing vocals
The Seaward Horns – horns
Michael Gibbs – string arrangements
Jerry Hey – horn arrangements

References

External links
 Stacy Lattisaw-Let Me Be Your Angel at Discogs

1980 albums
Stacy Lattisaw albums
Albums produced by Narada Michael Walden
Atlantic Records albums